Mark David Pagel FRS (born 5 June 1954 in Seattle, Washington) is an evolutionary biologist and professor. He heads the Evolutionary Biology Group at the University of Reading. He is known for comparative studies in evolutionary biology. In 1994, with his spouse, anthropologist Ruth Mace, Pagel pioneered the Comparative Method in Anthropology.

Education
Pagel was a student educated at the University of Washington where he was awarded a PhD in Mathematics in 1980 for work on ridge regression.

Research
During the late 1980s, Pagel worked on developing ways to analyse species relatedness, in the zoology department at the University of Oxford. Having met there, in 1994, Pagel and anthropologist Ruth Mace co-authored a paper, "The Comparative Method in Anthropology", that used phylogenetic methods to analyse human cultures, pioneering a new field of science — using evolutionary trees, or phylogenies, in anthropology, to explain human behaviour. Pagel's interests include evolution and the development of languages.

Pagel was the editor-in-chief for the Encyclopedia of Evolution, published in 2002. He authored Wired for Culture: The Natural History of Human Cooperation, which was voted one of  best science books of 2012 by The Guardian.

Personal life
Pagel's partner is Ruth Mace, professor of Evolutionary Anthropology at University College London. Together they have two sons, the first of whom was born the same year that Pagel's and Mace's landmark work, "The Comparative Method in Anthropology", was published in ''Current Anthropology.

Awards and honours
Pagel was elected a Fellow of the Royal Society in 2011. His nomination reads:

References

External links

Academics of the University of Reading
Living people
Evolutionary biologists
Fellows of the Royal Society
1954 births
Santa Fe Institute people
Paleolinguists